Desulfovibrio profundus is a bacterium. It is sulfate-reducing barophilic bacteria. It is strictly anaerobic, vibrio-shaped and its type strain is 500–1.

References

Further reading
Staley, James T., et al. "Bergey's manual of systematic bacteriology, vol. 3."Williams and Wilkins, Baltimore, MD (1989): 2250–2251. *Bélaich, Jean-Pierre, Mireille Bruschi, and Jean-Louis Garcia, eds. Microbiology and biochemistry of strict Anaerobes Involved in interspecies hydrogen transfer. No. 54. Springer, 1990.

External links 
LPSN

WORMS entry
Type strain of Desulfovibrio profundus at BacDive -  the Bacterial Diversity Metadatabase

Bacteria described in 1997
Desulfovibrio